Telmatophilus is a genus of silken fungus beetles in the family Cryptophagidae. There are about seven described species in Telmatophilus.

Species
These seven species belong to the genus Telmatophilus:
 Telmatophilus americanus (LeConte, 1863)
 Telmatophilus balcanicus Karaman, 1961
 Telmatophilus brevicollis Aubé, 1862
 Telmatophilus depressus Sharp, 1876
 Telmatophilus schoenherrii (Gyllenhal, 1808)
 Telmatophilus schonherrii (Gyllenhal, 1808)
 Telmatophilus typhae (Fallén, 1802)

References

Further reading

 
 
 
 

Cryptophagidae
Articles created by Qbugbot